The Greek Evangelical Church (Greek: Ελληνική Ευαγγελική Εκκλησία, Elliniki Evangeliki Ekklisia) is a Presbyterian denomination in Greece. It was the first Protestant church established in the country.

History
Greek Evangelical Church dates back to 1858 when the first Greek Evangelical, Michail Kalapothakis started publishing the magazine Astir tis Anatolis (Star of the East) which is still published today. He gathered a group of followers thus forming the first Greek Evangelical community and organized Sunday School for children as well as issuing the Efimeris ton Paidon (Newspaper of the Children) in 1868. The first Greek Evangelical Church was built in 1871 in the center of Athens, which was demolished and rebuilt in 1956 due to the increasing number of followers. Greek Evangelicalism spread also through the Greeks in the Ottoman Empire, the first Greek Evangelical community in Asia Minor was founded in 1867. Today there are 30 Greek Evangelical Churches in Greece, 3 in Cyprus and 5 in the Greek diaspora.

Theology
The Greek Evangelical Church is theologically Calvinist. Core beliefs are typical of most traditional Protestant denominations: they consider the Bible the highest and only binding authority on matters of doctrine and practice (sola scriptura) and recognize two sacraments (baptism and holy communion). Their Confession of Faith closely follows the Puritan Westminster Confession and consists of 28 articles.

Affiliations
The Greek Evangelical Church is affiliated with the World Communion of Reformed Churches and the World Council of Churches.

See also
Protestantism in Greece
Religion in Greece

References

External links
Greek Evangelical Church
Greek Evangelical Church of Los Angeles
Greek Evangelical Church of New York
Greek Evangelical Church of Boston
Greek Gospel Church of Toronto
Greek Evangelicals in Australia
Evangelical churches in Cyprus
Greek Helsinki Monitor on the Greek Evangelical Church

Members of the World Council of Churches
Religious organizations established in 1858
Members of the World Communion of Reformed Churches
Evangelical denominations established in the 19th century
Reformed denominations in Europe
Presbyterian denominations in Europe
Protestantism in Greece
1858 establishments in Greece